(1570 – September 9, 1612) was a Japanese daimyō in the Azuchi–Momoyama to Edo period. He was the 2nd son of Nakagawa Kiyohide.

Career
In 1582, Kiyohide died in the Battle of Shizugatake and Hidenari's brother Hidemasa succeeded to the family headship. However, Hidemasa died young in 1592 and Hidenari succeeded to the house and the domain. Thanks to his service under Toyotomi Hideyoshi, he was soon moved to the Oka Domain in Bungo Province, with an income raise from 66,000 koku to 74,000 koku. In 1597, Hidenari took part in the invasion of Korea under Tōdō Takatora.

In 1600 at the Battle of Sekigahara, he sided with the eastern army, attacking and defeating Ōta Kazuyoshi at Usuki Castle. As a result, Tokugawa Ieyasu let him maintain his domain without being disturbed.

References

 

This article is derived from corresponding content on the Japanese Wikipedia

1570 births
1612 deaths
Samurai